Kedzie is a Metra commuter railroad station in the East Garfield Park neighborhood on the West Side of Chicago. It is served by the Union Pacific West Line.

The station is at North Kedzie Avenue and West Carroll Avenue in an industrial and low-income residential neighborhood. The Chicago Transit Authority's elevated Kedzie station is on West Lake Street, about three blocks to the south. The Garfield Park Conservatory is nearby, and Westinghouse High School is just north of the station. The Union Pacific's California Avenue yard, where Metra coaches for the Union Pacific lines are stored during the day, is just to the east.

As of December 5, 2022, Kedzie is served by 35 trains (18 inbound and 17 outbound) on weekdays. No passenger trains stop at Kedzie station on weekends or holidays. , Kedzie is the 214th busiest of the 236 non-downtown stations in the Metra system, with an average of 41 weekday boardings.

Bus and rail connections
CTA Green Line 
Kedzie

CTA Buses 
  52 Kedzie

References

External links
Metra - Kedzie
Kedzie Avenue entrance from Google Maps Street View

Metra stations in Chicago
Former Chicago and North Western Railway stations
Railway stations in the United States opened in 1947
Union Pacific West Line